Wang Ao, courtesy name Fangxu, pseudonym Shouxi, born in Suzhou, Jiangsu province, was an official who lived in the Qing dynasty.

Life 
In 1723, during the reign of the Yongzheng Emperor, he passed the provincial civil service examination under the imperial examination system. Later, he was appointed as the magistrate in Liaoning. He was very fair and impartial during his term of office and earned great admiration from local people.

After Wang had retired as the magistrate, he was invited to teach in the White Deer Grotto Academy. During his teaching time, he launched an article called Deer Grotto Note, which was included in the White Deer Grotto Shu Yuan Zhi.

Hobbies 
Wang was fond of writing calligraphy, composing poems and writing articles. He did a good job in these fields and won a lot of praise.

References

Qing dynasty politicians from Jiangsu
Artists from Suzhou
Writers from Suzhou
Qing dynasty poets
Qing dynasty calligraphers
Qing dynasty essayists
Year of birth missing
Year of death missing
Politicians from Suzhou
Poets from Jiangsu